Pallamallawa or "Pally" is a small rural village approximately 30 kilometres east of Moree, in north-western New South Wales, Australia. It is on the banks of the Gwydir River, two kilometres north of the Gwydir Highway between Inverell and Moree.

The village is a service centre for surrounding agricultural production. The majority of the population was Christian, with Anglicans accounting for nearly half of the population, followed by Catholics and Presbyterians. Around 30% of the population was studying non-school based qualifications. The unemployment rate was 4%.

The region's agriculture industries are diverse and include irrigated crops (such as cotton and pecans), as well as livestock (mostly beef cattle) and cropping (mostly cereals and rotational legumes). The pecan industry is now well established  but growth in other novel crops, including olives, demonstrates a high level of innovation in agriculture.

Pallamallawa has a number of food and grocery service businesses, including a post office with banking facilities, a primary school, sporting amenities, a café/takeaway shop and a pub. The School's motto "Strive for Success" has been imparted on a number of famous Australians who have grown up in Pallamallawa, including poet Murray Hartin and light horseman Daniel Daley.

Pallamallawa is the hometown of many great Australians, including Brian AJ Newman LLB, Founder and President of the Australian Prison Officers Association, Chief Executive Officer of Workers First, Advocacy International and National Aboriginal and Torres Strait Islander Corporation - Advocacy Service.

References

External links

Tourist Information Guide to Pally
Pally Pictures
Pally School, Motto "Strive for Success"
Brian AJ Newman LLB

Pally people 

 Brian AJ Newman LLB - Human Rights Advocate

Towns in New South Wales
North West Slopes